Palayam is a 1994 Indian Malayalam-language film directed by T. S. Suresh Babu and written by Dennis Joseph, starring Manoj K. Jayan and Urvashi. Mammootty's character Christie appears in flashback and a stock footage from the film Kizhakkan Pathrose released two years earlier was used for the same.

Cast

References

External links
 

1994 films
1990s Malayalam-language films
Films based on Malayalam novels
Films directed by T. S. Suresh Babu